Jozef Ondrejka (born 20 May 1983) is a Slovak former professional ice hockey player who played with HC Slovan Bratislava in the Slovak Extraliga.

References

Living people
HC Slovan Bratislava players
1983 births
Slovak ice hockey goaltenders
MsHK Žilina players
HK 36 Skalica players
EHF Passau Black Hawks players
HK Trnava players
ŠHK 37 Piešťany players
Slovak expatriate ice hockey players in Germany
Slovak expatriate sportspeople in Hungary
Expatriate ice hockey players in Hungary